Roger Rhodes (born August 2, 1965) is a Canadian voice artist who works with Blue Water Studios. He is well known for having voiced Vegeta in the Canadian version of Dragon Ball GT.

Rhodes lives in Calgary with his wife Alice and daughter Amy, where he is also a DJ at the CKRY-FM radio station.

Rhodes attended the Sir Winston Churchill High School during the 1980s.

Filmography

Animation
Weeble - Winston Hobnobby III, Demby Wishingwell, Spotlight #1, Plug, Where O'Where

Anime
Cardfight!! Vanguard - Ren, MC Mya
Deltora Quest - Ferdinand, Grey Guard, Thaegan's Children
Dragon Ball - Korin, General Blue (Blue Water dub)
Dragon Ball GT - Kibito Kai, Vegeta (Blue Water dub)
Flame of Recca - Narrator, Kondo, Shigeo Hanabishi
Future Card Buddyfight - Black Death Dragon, Abygale, Elf Kabala
Gregory Horror Show - Cactus Gunman
The Law of Ueki - Karlpaccho
Lost Chapter of the Stars - Birth - Dubas Abriel
Mobile Fighter G Gundam - Chibodee Crocket
Mobile Suit Zeta Gundam - Jamaican Daninghan
Pretty Cure - Mepple, Chuutaro, Principal, Terry Blackstone (Episode 40)
Scan2Go - DJ, Utan
Transformers: Cybertron - Additional Voices

Video games
Crimson Tears - Tokio
Dynasty Warriors: Gundam - Crown, Torres
Dynasty Warriors: Gundam 2 - Jamaican Daninghan, Torres
Dynasty Warriors: Gundam 3 - Apolly Bay
Gregory Horror Show: Soul Collector - Cactus Gunman
Gundam: Battle Assault 2 - Chibodee Crocket
Mega Man Maverick Hunter X - Vile, Sting Chameleon
Mega Man Powered Up - Fire Man
Mega Man X8 - Gravity Antonion, Signas, Vile
Mobile Suit Gundam: Gundam vs. Zeta Gundam - Jamaican Daninghan
We Love Golf! - Announcer

References

External links

Canadian DJs
Canadian male video game actors
Canadian male voice actors
Canadian radio personalities
Living people
Male actors from Calgary
1965 births